Shane Bennett may refer to:

Shane Bennett (hurler) (born 1996), Irish hurler
Shane Bennett (baseball), Australia national baseball team
Shayne Bennett (born 1972), Australian rules footballer
Shane Bennett (died 2002), see Harris County Sheriff's Office (Texas)